People with the surname Sabbe include:

August Sabbe (1909–1978), one of the last surviving Estonian members of the Forest Brothers
Julius Sabbe (1846–1910),  Flemish publisher and parent of Maurits Sabbe
Maurits Sabbe (1873–1938), Flemish writer and child of Julius Sabbe
Noelle Sabbe, former French racing cyclist
Osman Saleh Sabbe (1932–1987), Eritrean revolutionary
Victor Sabbe (1906–1958), Belgian lawyer and liberal politician.